Batha Prefecture was one of the 14 prefectures of Chad. Located in the center of the country, Batha covered an area of 88,800 square kilometers and had a population of 288,458 in 1993. Its capital was Ati, Chad.  It is largely coextensive with the current Batha Region.

References

Prefectures of Chad

fr:Batha
scn:Batha